Fraserburgh Academy is a secondary school in Fraserburgh, Aberdeenshire. It is one of seventeen schools run by Aberdeenshire Council. The current school building was opened in 1962 by H.R.H The Princess Margaret.

History 
Fraserburgh Academy was originally established in 1870, at a site on Mid Street, after local clothier James Park saw a gap in the town's education. The building cost £2500 at the time, and the first headmaster was William McGill. By 1903, Robert Lees was rector of the academy. It was during this time that the school building was no longer fit for purpose, due to the rising school roll. A new school building was built on Finlayson Street at a cost of £7500 and would provide accommodation for 400 pupils and was opened on 8 June 1909 by Dr Dunn H.M Chief inspector of Schools.  300-400 children followed a pipe band from the Mid Street Academy to the new school.  By the 1950s the Academy was now full and a replacement was needed.  Another building, the current Academy, was built on Dennyduff Road, to accommodate 1500 pupils and was officially opened on 20 September 1962 by H.R.H the Princess Margaret accompanied by Lord Snowdon.

From 2019 to November 2021, a £2 million project was undertaken that saw facilities upgraded and the construction of a new drama studio. The project has allowed the entire school to be contained within a single building.

Notable former pupils

James Cowie, (1886-1956), painter and teacher
Sir Peter Scott Noble (1899-1987), academic
George Bruce, (1909-2002), poet
Bill Gibb, ( 1943 – 1988), fashion designer
Sir Lewis Duthie Ritchie, (1953- ) CITP, general practitioner and professor
Felicity Buchan, MP for Kensington (2019- )

References

External links
 

Secondary schools in Aberdeenshire
Buildings and structures in Fraserburgh
1909 establishments in Scotland
Educational institutions established in 1909